Percy Jackson & the Olympians is a series of five fantasy novels written by American author Rick Riordan, and the first book series in the Camp Half-Blood Chronicles. The novels are set in a world with the Greek gods in the 21st century, and follows the protagonist Percy Jackson, a young demigod who must prevent the Titans, led by Kronos (Cronus), from destroying the world.

The first three books were published in the United States by Miramax Books before it was folded into Hyperion Books, which published the following books. All the books were published in the United Kingdom by Penguin Books. Five supplementary books, along with graphic novel versions of each book, have also been released.  the books have sold more than 180 million copies worldwide, making it one of the best-selling book series of all time. Two sequel series, The Heroes of Olympus and The Trials of Apollo, follow. 

The first book was adapted into a film titled Percy Jackson & the Olympians: The Lightning Thief in 2010, which was commercially successful, but received mixed reviews from critics and the audience as it has very few similarities to the book. An adaptation of the second book, titled Percy Jackson: Sea of Monsters, was released in 2013, also to mixed reviews. A TV series based on the novels is currently in production for Disney+.

Origins

Development for the Percy Jackson series commenced when Rick Riordan began telling bedtime stories for his son Haley Riordan, who had at the time been diagnosed with ADHD and dyslexia. His son, Haley, had been studying Greek mythology in second grade and requested that his father tell him bedtime stories based on Greek myths. When Rick Riordan ran out of myths, his son suggested that he would make up new stories using existing mythological characters and new ones. This led Riordan to create the fictional character of Percy Jackson and create the story of him traveling across the United States to recover Zeus's lightning bolt, which was thought to be done by Hades. Haley suggested that he should turn that story into a book, and Riordan wrote the first book, later becoming known as The Lightning Thief, over the next year despite being busy at that time.

Leaving his manuscript with his agent and editor for review, Rick Riordan presented the book to a group of sixth, seventh, and eighth graders to read and critique. He gained their approval, and with their help, came up with the name of the book and created the way Percy's sword works. In 2004, the book was sold to Miramax Books for enough money for Riordan to quit his job and focus on writing. After it was released on 28 June 2005, it sold over 1.2 million copies. The book was released in multiple versions, including hardcover, paperback and audio editions. It has been translated into multiple languages and published all over the world.

Plot
Set in the mid-2000s, the series follows the story of Perseus "Percy" Jackson, a boy who discovers he is a demigod son of Poseidon. He was abandoned by his father because of an oath made by the Big Three (Zeus, Poseidon and Hades), the sons of Kronos, to not father any more children after World War II. The oath was sworn since the demigod children of the three gods are too powerful and have potential for great bloodshed (in-universe, World War II was a fight between children of the Big Three). Percy's journey turns even more electrifying when he discovers that numerous people and ancient monsters are trying to kill him due to his status as a demigod, latent strength, and growing influence in the Greek world. Percy also finds out that there are even more demigods like him in Camp Half-Blood, a training camp in Long Island.

With his friend Annabeth Chase, and his best friend and companion Grover Underwood (a satyr who Percy finds out is actually his protector), his journey across the frightening mystic worlds begins. Percy soon finds himself fulfilling extraordinary quests, prophecies, and fighting battles with and for the gods against the rising threat of the Titans. He also finds himself at a crossroads: either he helps in the destruction of the world, or in preserving it.

Books

The Lightning Thief

The Lightning Thief is the first book in the series and was released on June 28, 2005.

When Percy Jackson comes home for summer vacation, he and his mortal mother Sally Jackson travel to their cabin in Montauk to escape Percy's stepdad, Gabe Ugliano. However, the trip is cut short after a series of harrowing incidents, including an attack by the Minotaur, resulting in the disappearance of his mother. Percy finds himself at Camp Half-Blood, a training camp for demigods, and discovers that he too is a demigod, son of Poseidon, the Greek god of the sea. Percy also learns that his best friend, Grover Underwood, is actually a satyr (a forest spirit with horns, a human torso, and a goat's lower body), and that Zeus has accused Percy of having stolen his Master Bolt, the most powerful weapon in the universe. To clear his name, save the world from another war between the Olympian gods, and possibly save his mother, Percy sets out to retrieve the lightning bolt from Hades, who is suspected of being the real thief, after hearing a prophecy from an oracle at Camp Half-Blood. Percy, Grover, and Annabeth Chase, a daughter of Athena, start on a journey to the underworld, facing numerous mythological monsters on the way. After confronting an innocent Hades, they learn that their friend Luke Castellan, son of Hermes, is the real thief who stole the lightning bolt to allow Kronos, the defeated King of the Titans from the past, a chance to rise again and that Ares, the Greek god of war, helped cover up Luke's crime in order to instigate a war between Olympians. Percy fights Ares and Luke. He barely survived after being bitten by a pit scorpion. He later finds his mother, safe at home.

The book was adapted into a film by Chris Columbus and 20th Century Fox, under the title Percy Jackson & the Olympians: The Lightning Thief, and it was released on February 12, 2010.

The Sea of Monsters

The Sea of Monsters is the second installment in the series, released on April 1, 2006.

Camp Half-Blood is under attack when Thalia's tree, which guards the borders of the camp from the clutches of monsters, is poisoned and slowly begins to die. The camp director is accused and replaced. In order to save the tree and the camp, someone must recover the Golden Fleece, which is somewhere in the Sea of Monsters, the Bermuda Triangle. At the same time, Percy finds out that Grover, who has left on a quest to find the missing god Pan, has been captured by the Cyclops Polyphemus and that the Fleece is on Polyphemus' island. Percy sets out to rescue Grover with Annabeth and his Cyclops half-brother Tyson, even though Tantalus, who had replaced Chiron as the camp's activities director, has prohibited him from doing so. Meanwhile, Ares' daughter Clarisse La Rue is sent on an official quest by Camp Half-Blood to retrieve the Fleece. The trip to the Sea of Monsters is long and hazardous, and along the way the heroes encounter several dangers including Scylla and Charybdis, the sorceress Circe, the Sirens, and their former friend Luke Castellan. Percy also learns of a prophecy from the Oracle of Delphi: A child of one of "the Big Three" most important gods (Zeus, Poseidon, and Hades) will play a vital part in the success or failure of resurrecting Kronos the Titan-King and saving Olympus. After encountering Luke, the heroes eventually retrieve the Fleece and restore Thalia's tree, unknowingly resurrecting Thalia, daughter of Zeus. She had been turned into the tree by her father after she sacrificed herself so Annabeth and Luke could get safely to Camp Half-Blood six years prior.

The book was adapted into a film by Thor Freudenthal and 20th Century Fox, under the title Percy Jackson: Sea of Monsters, and was released on August 7, 2013.

The Titan's Curse

The Titan's Curse is the third installment in the series. It was released on May 11, 2007.

On a mission to rescue the half-bloods Bianca and Nico di Angelo; Percy, Annabeth, Thalia and Grover are attacked by a Manticore, and rescued by the goddess Artemis and her Hunters. However, Annabeth falls off a cliff while fighting the manticore and is captured. Later, Artemis is captured by Luke's army while on the hunt for the Ophiotaurus, a cow-serpent monster that was foretold to bring the downfall of Olympus when its entrails are sacrificed. Artemis' lieutenant Zoë Nightshade, daughter of Atlas and a sister of the Hesperides leads Bianca (now a hunter), Thalia, and Grover on a quest to save her. Percy, who was not invited to join the party, follows them on behalf of Nico di Angelo, promising that he will do his best to protect Nico's sister Bianca, as well as wanting to find Annabeth. The others eventually encounter Percy when he warned them about skeletal warriors pursuing them, and he joins their group despite getting nearly killed by Zoë and Bianca before being accepted.

The group are chased across the country. Bianca is able to kill one, which leaves the others mystified. As they make their way across a godly junkyard, Bianca sets off a trap. She later dies sacrificing herself to save the others, breaking Percy's promise to Nico. They find Annabeth with Luke and Artemis, who is holding up the sky. Percy then takes it from Artemis and they trick Atlas into his original position under the sky. Thalia replaces Zoë, who dies saving Artemis and, as Artemis' lieutenant. Thalia's induction as a lieutenant of Artemis ensures that she will become immortal, never aging to reach 16, thus escaping the Great Prophecy and leaving Percy to fulfill it. They return to camp and Percy informs Nico about Bianca's death during the journey. Nico blames Percy for failing to protect her and runs away, only after causing skeletal warriors invading the camp to fall into the dark void of the Underworld, thus alerting Percy to the fact that Hades is Nico and Bianca's father.

The Battle of the Labyrinth

The Battle of the Labyrinth, the fourth installment in the series, was released on May 6, 2008.

Percy, Annabeth, Grover, and Tyson go on a quest to find Ariadne's string in order to locate Daedalus's workshop within the labyrinth, which Luke Castellan and his army are looking for too. A swordsman named Quintus is subbing for Mr. D as Camp Half-Blood's director, since Mr. D is on a mission to get the minor gods to be on the gods' side of the war. The questers go on a journey inside the labyrinth, facing many monsters. They eventually discover a forge belonging to the god Hephaestus being used by Kronos's smiths. To escape, Percy triggered a volcanic eruption that puts him in a coma.

Percy awakes on the island Ogygia, being tended by the immortal Calypso. He eventually returns to his friends and recruits Rachel Elizabeth Dare, a mortal he encountered in the previous book, to navigate the labyrinth. With Rachel's help, the group find Daedalus's workshop, where they find out that Quintus is actually Daedalus. Daedalus betrays them and sells them out to Luke, and the questers flee back to camp. Luke's army follows them and a battle ensues. The demigods win but suffer many casualties including Daedalus, Castor, and Lee Fletcher. After the battle, they prepare for the oncoming war against Lord Kronos, who has possessed the body of Luke Castellan and who has risen to obliterate Olympus.

The Last Olympian

The Last Olympian, the fifth and final installment in the series, was released on May 5, 2009.

Percy Jackson learns that Kronos' forces are preparing to attack Olympus. Poseidon, Percy's father, decides that it is time for Percy to learn what exactly the Great Prophecy means. Seeking a way to defeat Kronos, Nico di Angelo tells Percy his plan, though Percy doesn't like it. Percy bathes in the River Styx, making his body invulnerable except one small chosen part of his body (his Achilles' heel, in his case the small of his back). Kronos leads a siege of New York City and puts its mortal citizens to sleep. Percy leads the campers, Hunters, nature spirits, and centaurs to protect Mount Olympus from Kronos and his forces. While they protect Olympus, the gods battle the monster Typhon as he makes his way across the country to New York. Kronos, possessing Luke's body, forces his way into Olympus and battles Percy in Olympus' throne room. Typhon reaches New York but is defeated after the arrival of Poseidon's forces, led by Tyson.

Annabeth is able to help Luke overcome Kronos, and Percy gives Annabeth's knife to Luke. Luke, also invulnerable from bathing in the River Styx, stabs himself in his armpit, his mortal spot to destroy Kronos and save Mount Olympus, dying heroically. The gods reward Percy and his friends and offer him immortality. Percy rejects the offer but instead requests for the gods to claim all their children and to have cabins for all the gods, including the minor ones. Rachel Elizabeth Dare becomes Apollo's next Oracle, breaking Hades' curse on the position, and recites the next Great Prophecy. The book finishes with Percy and Annabeth becoming a couple, and ominous clouds looming over Rachel's next Great Prophecy. The story is continued in sequel series The Heroes of Olympus and The Trials of Apollo.

Supplementary works

The Demigod Files

The Demigod Files, also written by Rick Riordan, is the first companion book to the series. It was released February 10, 2009, featuring three short stories, interviews with the campers, puzzles and pictures. It is set between The Battle of the Labyrinth and The Last Olympian. The book received mixed reviews, with some reviewers criticizing the lack of substantial material and others commenting on the writing of the short stories. The stories are Percy Jackson and the Stolen Chariot, Percy Jackson and the Bronze Dragon, The Camper Interviews, and Percy Jackson and the Sword of Hades. At the end of the book, there are portraits on the characters of the series.

The Ultimate Guide
The Ultimate Guide is a companion book, second to the series, released on January 19, 2010. This book has a magnetic cover and holographic character pictures that change into four different characters. Its 156 pages include trading cards, full-color diagrams, and maps. It also includes a dictionary of almost every monster Percy faces in the series, with pictures beside some, as well as various activities. The book tells of Percy Jackson's starting life as a half-blood, a tour of the Underworld by Nico di Angelo, the story of Sally Jackson's parents, and items used throughout the series. There is also a paperback version.

Graphic novels
Graphic novels based on each book of the series have been released: The Lightning Thief on October 12, 2010, The Sea of Monsters on July 2, 2013, The Titan's Curse on October 8, 2013, The Battle of the Labyrinth on October 2, 2018, and The Last Olympian on August 13, 2019.

Demigods and Monsters
Demigods and Monsters is an unofficial companion book and was released on February 11, 2009. With an introduction by Riordan, it features essays written by various young adult authors that explore, discuss and provide further insight into the Percy Jackson series. At 196 pages, it also contains information on the places and characters of the series, as well as a glossary of Greek myths.

The Demigod Diaries

The Demigod Diaries contains four new stories with character interviews, illustrations of characters and more, puzzles, and a quiz. The four stories include the adventures of Thalia, Luke, and Annabeth, and others that precede the Percy Jackson and the Olympians series and a first-person narrative from Percy's viewpoint. Set a month after the events of The Last Olympian and before he goes missing in The Lost Hero, Percy and Annabeth retrieve Hermes' stolen staff. One of the stories is written by Riordan's son, Haley, and revolves around one of the demigods who fought for Kronos during the Second Titan War and survived the battle in Manhattan.
The Demigod Diaries also contains a story involving Jason, Leo, and Piper that recounts their time spent at Camp Half-Blood between The Lost Hero and The Mark of Athena.

Percy Jackson and the Chalice of the Gods 
A standalone novel, Percy Jackson and the Chalice of the Gods, was announced in October 2022, with a release date of September 26, 2023. In the book, which takes place between the events of The Heroes of Olympus and The Trials of Apollo, Percy, Annabeth and Grover are tasked with retrieving Ganymede's lost goblet, in order for Percy to get his recommendation letter for New Rome University. The novel will be written from Percy's point of view, much like in the series.

Reception
The Lightning Thief received mostly positive reviews and won awards including the School Library Journal Best Book of 2005. The New York Times praised The Lightning Thief as “perfectly paced, with electrifying moments chasing each other like heartbeats”. Author Rick Riordan said of the various awards, "The ultimate compliment for a children's writer is when the kids like it."

Like its predecessor, The Sea of Monsters won several prizes and received generally positive reviews as well. It sold over 100,000 copies in hardcover by the time it was released in paperback and reviewers have praised the storyline, themes and the author's style of writing. Matt Berman, of Common Sense Media, praised the book, saying “The Percy Jackson series continues to be pure fun, with the author doing nearly everything right to produce a book that few kids will be able to resist.” Kirkus reviewed The Battle of the Labyrinth as, “This volume can stand alone, but no one will be able to read just one [...] look no further for the next Harry Potter, meet Percy Jackson as legions of fans already have.” As of December 11, 2019, it has been on the New York Times Children's Series Best Seller List for 665 weeks.

Some critics, especially Christian critics, of Riordan have disapproved of the emphasis on pagan gods in his books. Riordan responds to these complaints by reminding his readers that first and foremost,

"The Lightning Thief explores Greek mythology in a modern setting, but it does so as a humorous work of fantasy. I'm certainly not interested in changing or contradicting anyone's religious beliefs. Early in the book, the character Chiron makes a distinction between God, capital-G, the creator of the universe, and the Greek gods. Chiron says he does not want to delve into the issue of God, but he has no qualms about discussing the Olympians because they are a 'much smaller matter.'"

Critics such as The Calico Critic have also disagreed with the fusion of Greek mythology and modern American culture. They have stated that it is difficult to believe "the reality of the tale", claiming that "monsters in the St. Louis Arch" and "the entrance to Olympus in New York" were unimaginable, despite Riordan's explanations of why he chose these certain locations.

In other media

Films

Chris Columbus directed and produced Percy Jackson & the Olympians: The Lightning Thief for 20th Century Fox through 1492 Pictures. The film was released February 2, 2010. 
Columbus has stated that he was drawn to directing the Percy Jackson movie because it gave him the "opportunity to do a movie that we haven't really seen before for this generation. When I was a kid, there were movies that dealt with Greek mythology, which in terms of visual effects was really primitive. So I thought this was an opportunity to deal with Greek mythology which children and adults all over the world are fascinated by and it was not a new genre but a new avenue, dealing with mythological creatures in a contemporary setting."

The second film in the series, Percy Jackson: Sea of Monsters, was released on August 7, 2013. A third film, Percy Jackson: Titan's Curse, was in development but never went into production.

Video game
A video game based on the film adaption of The Lightning Thief developed by Activision was released exclusively for Nintendo DS on February 11, 2010. GameZone's Michael Splechta gave it a 6/10, saying "Percy Jackson might not make a splash when it comes to movie tie-in games, but fans of turn-based combat might find some redeeming qualities in this otherwise bare-bones game." On Metacritic, the game has a score of 56 out of 100 based on 6 reviews, indicating "mixed or average reviews".

Musical

On January 12, 2017, A Series of Unfortunate Events story editor Joe Tracz wrote a musical adaptation of The Lightning Thief. The musical debuted off-Broadway in 2017, before going on a national tour in 2019, followed by a 16-week limited run on Broadway from October 2019 to January 2020. It was nominated for three Drama Desk Awards in 2017, including a nomination for Outstanding Musical.

Television series

The rights to the Percy Jackson novels were transferred to Disney following its acquisition of 21st Century Fox in 2019. In May 2020, Riordan announced that Disney would be producing a live-action television series following the story of the series, with the first season adapting The Lightning Thief. Riordan also confirmed that he, along with his wife Becky, would be involved in the development of the series, a significant departure from the film series, in which Riordan was mostly shut out of the filmmaking process. The series was greenlit in January 2022, began production in June 2022, and is scheduled to premiere on Disney+ in early 2024.

Related series

Sequel series

The Heroes of Olympus

The Heroes of Olympus is a sequel series, also based on Camp Half-Blood and Greek mythology and introduces Camp Jupiter and its associated Roman mythology. The first book The Lost Hero was released on October 12, 2010. Like the first series, there are five books.

The second book in The Heroes of Olympus, The Son of Neptune, was released in October 2011. The third book, The Mark of Athena, was released on October 2, 2012. The fourth book, The House of Hades, was released on October 8, 2013. The fifth and final book of The Heroes of Olympus series, The Blood of Olympus, was released on October 7, 2014.

The Trials of Apollo

Riordan's follow up series to The Heroes of Olympus book series is titled The Trials of Apollo. It is written from the point of view of Apollo, having been cast down from Olympus by Zeus. The first installment, titled The Hidden Oracle, was released on May 3, 2016. The second book titled The Dark Prophecy was released in May 2017. The third book titled The Burning Maze was released on May 1, 2018. The fourth book of the series, The Tyrant's Tomb, was released on September 24, 2019. The fifth and last book of the pentalogy, The Tower of Nero, was released on October 6, 2020.

Other series

The Kane Chronicles

The novels are set within the same fictional universe as the three previous book series, and is narrated alternately in first-person by the two protagonist-siblings Carter and Sadie Kane. The siblings are descended from the two pharaohs Narmer and Ramses the Great and are powerful magicians. They and their friends are forced to contend with Egyptian gods and goddesses who still interact with the real world. The series includes a trilogy consisting of The Red Pyramid (2010), The Throne of Fire (2011), and The Serpent's Shadow (2012), as well as three crossover books with the Percy Jackson & the Olympians series.

Magnus Chase and the Gods of Asgard

The main protagonist Magnus Chase, son of the Vanir god of fertility Frey, narrates the novel in first person. He has a relationship with Alex Fierro, another main character, and his Valkyrie is Samirah al-Abbas, a daughter of Loki. He is also the cousin of Annabeth Chase, a main character in the Percy Jackson and the Olympians and The Heroes of Olympus series, who links the two series together. The series consists of a trilogy of books, The Sword of Summer (2015), The Hammer of Thor (2016), and The Ship of the Dead (2017).

See also

 List of artistic depictions of dyslexia
 Muses in popular culture
 From the Files of the Time Rangers – also based on the premise of Greek gods active in modern-day United States
 Myth-o-Mania - children's book series depicting modern twists on Greek mythology
 Olympians (Marvel Comics)/Thor (Marvel Comics) – comics based on the same premise, with both Greek and Norse gods.

References

External links

 Percy Jackson and the Olympians series site from publisher Disney (readriordan.com)
 Rick Riordan Myth Master at publisher Penguin Books (UK)
 Percy Jackson & the Olympians official Persian-language website percy-jackson.ir (archived 2010)
 Teacher's Guide at Educational Resources from Rick Riordan (rickriordan.com)
 
 

 
Book series introduced in 2005
American bildungsromans
Dyslexia in fiction
Pentalogies
Young adult novel series